Brendon Rodney (born 9 April 1992) is a Canadian sprinter. As a member of the Canadian men's relay team, he is a two-time Olympic medallist in the 4 × 100 metres relay, taking silver in 2020 and bronze in 2016. He is also the 2022 World champion and 2015 World bronze medallist in the same event.

Career
Rodney attended St. Augustine Secondary School in Brampton. Rodney was named to Canada's team for the 2013 Summer Universiade. The following year he competed for Canada's team at the 2014 Commonwealth Games. He then competed as part of the Canadian team at the 2015 Pan American Games in Toronto.

On his way to competing for Canada at the 2016 Summer Olympics, Rodney became just the second Canadian man to run the 200 m in under 20 seconds when he ran a 19.96 at the national trials in Edmonton, beating favourite Andre De Grasse. The win came just weeks after his mother almost died of a brain aneurysm. In July 2016, he was named to Canada's Olympic team.  In addition to winning a bronze medal with the Canadian relay team, he competed in the men's 200 m event, placing third in the seventh of the preliminary heats.

In August 2017, Rodney competed in the 2017 World Championships in Athletics, representing Canada in the 4x100 m relay. The Canadian relay team ultimately placed sixth place in the finals.

Despite being defending gold medalists in the 4×200 m at the 2019 World Relay Championships, Rodney and the Canadian relay team failed to advance out of the heats in the 4×100 m relay. Competing at the 2019 World Athletics Championships in Doha, Rodney placed thirteenth in the heats of the 200 m, and did not advance. In a disappointing finish, the Canadian relay team did not advance to the 4×100 m final despite having the eighth-fastest overall time due to their running in the faster of the two heats.

While the COVID-19 pandemic delayed the 2020 Summer Olympics by a year, Rodney was eventually named to his second Olympic team. He placed sixth in his heat of the 200 m with a time of 20.60 and did not advance. Subsequently, the relay team of Rodney, Aaron Brown, Jerome Blake, and Andre De Grasse won their second consecutive bronze medal in the 4×100 m relay. On 18 February 2022, Great Britain was stripped of its silver medal in the men's 4×100 m relay after the Court of Arbitration for Sport confirmed CJ Ujah’s doping violation. Canada was upgraded to silver.

At the 2022 World Athletics Championships in Eugene, Oregon, the prospects of the Canadian 4×100 m relay team were called into question due to anchor runner De Grasse's struggles with COVID-19 infection shortly before the championships. However, the Canadian team qualified for the finals with the third-fastest time in the heats, only 0.01 seconds out of second. In the final, the Canadians staged a major upset victory over the heavily favoured American team to take the gold medal, aided by smooth baton exchanges while the Americans made multiple fumbles, breaking the national record in the process. This was Canada's third gold in the event, and the others being consecutive Donovan Bailey-era wins in 1995 and 1997. The result "stunned" the heavily American crowd at Hayward Field, though De Grasse noted, "there's a lot of Canadian flags out there, a lot of fans cheering us on."

References

External links
 
 

1992 births
Living people
Canadian male sprinters
World Athletics Championships athletes for Canada
World Athletics Championships medalists
Athletes (track and field) at the 2016 Summer Olympics
Olympic track and field athletes of Canada
Olympic bronze medalists for Canada
Athletes from Toronto
Sportspeople from Etobicoke
Track and field athletes from Ontario
Olympic bronze medalists in athletics (track and field)
Medalists at the 2016 Summer Olympics
Universiade medalists in athletics (track and field)
Black Canadian track and field athletes
Athletes (track and field) at the 2018 Commonwealth Games
Universiade gold medalists for Canada
Athletes (track and field) at the 2019 Pan American Games
Pan American Games track and field athletes for Canada
Medalists at the 2013 Summer Universiade
Commonwealth Games competitors for Canada
Athletes (track and field) at the 2020 Summer Olympics
Medalists at the 2020 Summer Olympics
Olympic silver medalists for Canada
Olympic silver medalists in athletics (track and field)
20th-century Canadian people
21st-century Canadian people